Prostanthera gilesii is a species of flowering plant in the family Lamiaceae and is endemic to the Mount Canobolas area of New South Wales. It is a small, compact, spreading shrub with aromatic, narrow egg-shaped to elliptical leaves, and white to yellowish white flowers with purple to dark mauve markings inside the petal tube and pale orange markings on the petal lobes.

Description
Flowering occurs in November and December.

Taxonomy and naming
Prostanthera gilesii was first formally described in 2015 by Barry Conn and Trevor Wilson from an unpublished description by George Althofer and the description was published in the journal Telopea. The specific epithet (gilesii) was proposed by Althofer to honour William E. Giles who discovered the species in the 1940s.

Distribution and habitat
This mint bush grows in forest dominated by Eucalyptus dalrympleana but is only known from the Mount Canobolas State Conservation Area.

Conservation status
This mintbush is listed as "critically endangered" under the New South Wales Government Biodiversity Conservation Act 2016. The main threats to the species are its small population size, inappropriate fire regimes, weed invasion, disturbance by pigs and illegal collection of plant material.

References

gilesii
Flora of New South Wales
Lamiales of Australia
Plants described in 2015
Taxa named by Barry John Conn